A public–private partnership (PPP, 3P, or P3) is a long-term arrangement between a government and private sector institutions. Typically, it involves private capital financing government projects and services up-front, and then drawing revenues from taxpayers and/or users over the course of the PPP contract. Public–private partnerships have been implemented in multiple countries and are primarily used for infrastructure projects. They have been employed for building, equipping, operating and maintaining schools, hospitals, transport systems, and water and sewerage systems.

Cooperation between private actors, corporations and governments has existed since the inception of sovereign states, notably for the purpose of tax collection and colonization. However, contemporary "public-private partnerships" came into being around the end of the 20th century. They were associated with neoliberal policies to increase the private sector's involvement in public administration. Originally, they were seen by governments around the world as a method of financing new or refurbished public sector assets outside their balance sheet. At the dawn of the millennium, this vision of PPPs came under heavy criticism as taxpayers or users still had to pay for those PPP projects, along with disproportionately high interest costs.

PPPs continue to be highly controversial as funding tools, largely over concerns that public return on investment is lower than returns for the private funder. PPPs are closely related to concepts such as privatization and the contracting out of government services. The lack of a shared understanding of what a PPP is and the secrecy surrounding their financial details makes the process of evaluating whether PPPs have been successful, complex. PPP advocates highlight the sharing of risk and the development of innovation, while critics decry their higher costs and issues of accountability. Evidence of PPP performance in terms of value for money and efficiency, for example, is mixed and often unavailable.

Definition

There is no consensus about how to define a PPP. The term can cover hundreds of different types of long-term contracts with a wide range of risk allocations, funding arrangements, and transparency requirements. The advancement of PPPs, as a concept and a practice, is a product of the new public management of the late 20th century, the rise of neoliberalism, and globalization pressures. Despite there being no formal consensus regarding a definition, the term has been defined by major entities.

For example, The OECD formally defines public-private-partnerships as "long term contractual arrangements between the government and a private partner whereby the latter delivers and funds public services using a capital asset, sharing the associated risks".

According to David L. Weimer and Aidan R. Vining, "A P3 typically involves a private entity financing, constructing, or managing a project in return for a promised stream of payments directly from government or indirectly from users over the projected life of the project or some other specified period of time".

A 2013 study published in State and Local Government Review found that definitions of public-private partnerships vary widely between municipalities: "Many public and private officials tout public-private partnerships for any number of activities, when in truth the relationship is contractual, a franchise, or the load shedding of some previously public service to a private or nonprofit entity." A more general term for such agreements is "shared service delivery", in which public-sector entities join together with private firms or non-profit organizations to provide services to citizens.

Debate on privatization

There is a semantic debate pertaining to whether public–private partnerships constitute privatization or not. Some argue that it isn't "privatization" because the government retains ownership of the facility and/or remains responsible for public service delivery. Others argue that they exist on a continuum of privatization; P3s being a more limited form of privatization than the outright sale of public assets, but more extensive than simply contracting-out government services.

Because "privatization" has a negative connotation, supporters of P3s generally take the position that P3s do not constitute privatization, while P3 opponents argue that they do. The Canadian Union of Public Employees describes P3s as "privatization by stealth".

Origins 
Governments have used such a mix of public and private endeavors throughout history. Muhammad Ali of Egypt utilized "concessions" in the early 1800s to obtain public works for minimal cost while the concessionaires' companies made most of the profits from projects such as railroads and dams. Much of the early infrastructure of the United States was built by what can be considered public-private partnerships. This includes the Philadelphia and Lancaster Turnpike road in Pennsylvania, which was initiated in 1792, an early steamboat line between New York and New Jersey in 1808; many of the railroads, including the nation's first railroad, chartered in New Jersey in 1815; and most of the modern electric grid. In Newfoundland, Robert Gillespie Reid contracted to operate the railways for fifty years from 1898, though originally they were to become his property at the end of the period.

However, the late 20th and early 21st century saw a clear trend toward governments across the globe making greater use of various PPP arrangements. Pressure to change the standard model of public procurement arose initially from concerns about the level of public debt, which grew rapidly during the macroeconomic dislocation of the 1970s and 1980s. Governments sought to encourage private investment in infrastructure, initially on the basis of neoliberal ideology and accounting fallacies arising from the fact that public accounts did not distinguish between recurrent and capital expenditures.

In 1992, the Conservative government of John Major in the United Kingdom introduced the Private finance initiative (PFI), the first systematic program aimed at encouraging public-private partnerships. The 1992 program focused on reducing the public-sector borrowing requirement, although, as already noted, the effect on public accounts was largely illusory. Initially, the private sector was unenthusiastic about PFI, and the public sector was opposed to its implementation. In 1993, the Chancellor of the Exchequer described its progress as "disappointingly slow". To help promote and implement the policy, Major created institutions staffed with people linked with the City of London, accountancy and consultancy firms who had a vested interest in the success of PFI. 

Around the same time, PPPs were being initiated haphazardly in various OECD countries. The first governments to implement them were ideologically neoliberal and short on revenues: they were thus politically and fiscally inclined to try out alternative forms of public procurement. These early PPP projects were usually pitched by wealthy and politically-connected business magnates. This explains why each countries experimenting with PPPs started in different sectors. At that time, PPPs were seen as a radical reform of government service provision.

In 1997, the new british government of Tony Blair's Labour Party expanded the PFI but sought to shift the emphasis to the achievement of "value for money", mainly through an appropriate allocation of risk. Blair created Partnerships UK (PUK), a new semi-independent organization to replace the previous pro-PPP government institutions. Its mandate was to promote and implement PFI. PUK was central in making PPPs the "new normal" for public infrastructure procurements in the country. Multiple countries subsequently created similar PPP units based on PUK's model.

While initiated in first world countries, PPPs immediately received significant attention in developing countries. This is because the PPP model promised to bring new sources of funding for infrastructure projects, which could translate into jobs and economic growth. However, the lack of investor rights guarantees, commercial confidentiality laws, and dedicated state spending on public infrastructure in these countries made the implementation of public–private partnership in transition economies difficult. PPPs in the countries usually can't rely on stable revenues from user fees either. The World Bank's Public-Private Infrastructure Advisory Forum attempts to mitigate these challenges.

Funding
A defining aspect of many infrastructure P3s is that most of the up-front financing is made through the private sector. The way this financing is done differs significantly by country. For P3s in the UK, bonds are used rather than bank loans. In Canada, P3 projects usually use loans that must be repaid within five years, and the projects are refinanced at a later date. In some types of public-private partnership, the cost of using the service is borne exclusively by the users of the service—for example, by toll road users. In other types (notably the PFI), capital investment is made by the private sector on the basis of a contract with the government to provide agreed-on services, and the cost of providing the services is borne wholly or in part by the government.

Special purpose vehicle 

Typically, a private-sector consortium forms a special company called a special-purpose vehicle (SPV) to develop, build, maintain, and operate the asset for the contracted period. In cases where the government has invested in the project, it is typically (but not always) allotted an equity share in the SPV. The consortium is usually made up of a building contractor, a maintenance company, and one or more equity investors. The two former are typically equity holders in the project, who make decisions but are only repaid when the debts are paid, while the latter is the project's creditor (debt holder).

It is the SPV that signs the contract with the government and with subcontractors to build the facility and then maintain it. A typical PPP example would be a hospital building financed and constructed by a private developer and then leased to the hospital authority. The private developer then acts as landlord, providing housekeeping and other non-medical services, while the hospital itself provides medical services.

The SPV links the firms responsible of the building phase and the operating phase together. Hence there is a strong incentives in the building stage to make investments with regard to the operating stage. These investments can be desirable but may also be undesirable (e.g., when the investments not only reduce operating costs but also reduce service quality).

Financial partners 
Public infrastructure is a relatively low-risk, high-reward investment, and combining it with complex arrangements and contracts that guarantee and secure the cash flows make PPP projects prime candidates for project financing. The equity investors in SPVs are usually institutional investors such as pension funds, life insurance companies, sovereign wealth and superannuation funds, and banks. Major P3 investors include AustralianSuper, OMERS and Dutch state-owned bank ABN AMRO, which funded the majority of P3 projects in Australia. Wall Street firms have increased their interest in PPP since the 2008 financial crisis.

Government 
Government sometimes make in kind contributions to a PPP, notably with the transfer of existing assets. In projects that are aimed at creating public goods, like in the infrastructure sector, the government may provide a capital subsidy in the form of a one-time grant so as to make the project economically viable. In other cases, the government may support the project by providing revenue subsidies, including tax breaks or by guaranteed annual revenues for a fixed period.

Profits 
Private monopolies created by PPPs can generate a rent-seeking behavior, which leads to spiraling costs for users and/or taxpayers in the operation phase of the project.

Some public-private partnerships, when the development of new technologies is involved, include profit-sharing agreements. This generally involves splitting revenues between the inventor and the public once a technology is commercialized. Profit-sharing agreements may stand over a fixed period of time or in perpetuity.

P3 justifications 
Using PPPs have been justified in various ways over time. Advocates generally argue that PPPs enable the public sector to harness the expertise and efficiencies that the private sector can bring to the delivery of certain facilities and services traditionally procured and delivered by the public sector. On the other hand, critics suggest that PPPs are part of an ideological program that seeks to privatize public services for the profits of private entities.

Off-balance-sheet accounting 
PPPs are often structured so that borrowing for the project does not appear on the balance sheet of the public-sector body seeking to make a capital investment. Rather, the borrowing is incurred by the private-sector vehicle implementing the project, with or without an explicit backup guarantee of the loan by the public body. On PPP projects where the cost of using the service is intended to be borne exclusively by the end-user, or through a lease billed to the government every year during the operation phase of the project, the PPP is, from the public sector's perspective, an "off-balance sheet" method of financing the delivery of new or refurbished public-sector assets.

This justification was particularly important during the 1990s, but has been exposed as an accounting trick designed to make the government of the day appear more fiscally responsible, while offloading the costs of their projects to service users or future governments. In Canada, many auditor generals have condemned this practice, and forced governments to include PPP projects "on-balance sheet".

On PPP projects where the public sector intends to compensate the private sector through availability payments once the facility is established or renewed, the financing is, from the public sector's perspective, "on-balance sheet". According to PPP advocates, the public sector will regularly benefit from significantly deferred cash flows. This viewpoint has been contested through research that shows that a majority of PPP projects ultimately cost significantly more than traditional public ones.

In the European Union, the fact that PPP debt is not recorded as debt and remains largely "off-balance-sheet" has become a major concern. Indeed, keeping the PPP project and its contingent liabilities "off balance sheet" means that the true cost of the project is hidden. According to the International Monetary Fund, economic ownership of the asset should determine whether to record PPP-related assets and liabilities in the government's or the private corporation's balance sheet is not straightforward.

Project costs

The effectiveness of PPPs as cost-saving venture has been refuted by numerous studies. Research has showed that on average, governments pay more for PPPs projects than for traditional publicly financed projects. The higher cost of P3s is attributed to these systemic factors:
The private sector's higher cost of capital: governments can typically borrow capital at an interest rate lower than any private company ever could. This is because governments have the power of taxation, which guarantees that they will be able to repay their debts. Since lending to governments almost always come at a lower risk than lending to private entities, governments get better credit and cheaper financing costs for building large infrastructure projects than private finance.
Transaction costs: P3 contracts are much more complex and extensive than contracts made in traditional publicly financed projects. The negotiation of these contracts require the presence of lawyers on all sides of the table and can take months or even years to finalize. Barrie Mckenna reports that "transaction costs for lawyers and consultants [in P3s] add about 3 percent to the final bill."
Operating profits:  Private companies that engage in P3s expect a return on investment after the completion of the project. By financing PPPs, they partner engages in low-risk speculation. Over the course of the contract, the private partner can charge the end-users and/or the government for more money than the cost of the initial investment.

Sometimes, private partners manage to overcome these costs and provide a project cheaper for taxpayers. This can be done by cutting corners, designing the project so as to be more profitable in the operational phase, charging user fees, and/or monetizing aspects of the projects not covered by the contract. For P3 schools in Nova Scotia, this latter aspect has included restricting the use of schools' fields and interior walls, and charging after-hours facility access to community groups at 10 times the rate of non-P3 schools.

In Ontario, a 2012 review of 28 projects showed that the costs were on average 16% lower for traditional publicly procured projects than for PPPs. A 2014 report by the Auditor General of Ontario said that the province overpaid by $8 billion through PPPs.

Value for money

In response to these negative findings about the costs and quality of P3 projects, proponents developed formal procedures for the assessment of PPPs which focused heavily on value for money. Heather Whiteside defines P3 "Value for money" as:Not to be confused with lower overall project costs, value for money is a concept used to evaluate P3 private-partner bids against a hypothetical public sector comparator designed to approximate the costs of a fully public option (in terms of design, construction, financing, and operations). P3 value for money calculations consider a range of costs, the exact nature of which has changed over time and varies by jurisdiction. One thing that does remain consistent, however, is the favoring of "risk transfer" to the private partner, to the detriment of the public sector comparator.Value for money assessment procedures were incorporated into the PFI and its Australian and Canadian counterparts beginning in the late 1990s and early 2000s. A 2012 study showed that value-for-money frameworks were still inadequate as an effective method of evaluating PPP proposals. The problem is that it is unclear what the catchy term "value-for-money" means in the technical details relating to their practical implementation. A Scottish auditor once qualified this use of the term as "technocratic mumbo-jumbo".

Project promoters often contract a PPP unit or one of the Big Four accounting firms to conduct the value for money assessments.  Because these firms also offer PPP consultancy services, they have a vested interest in recommending the PPP option over the traditional public procurement method. The lack of transparency surrounding individual PPP projects makes it difficult to draft independent value-for-money assessments.

A number of Australian studies of early initiatives to promote private investment in infrastructure concluded that in most cases, the schemes being proposed were inferior to the standard model of public procurement based on competitively tendered construction of publicly owned assets. In 2009, the New Zealand Treasury, in response to inquiries by the new National Party government, released a report on PPP schemes that concluded that "there is little reliable empirical evidence about the costs and benefits of PPPs" and that there "are other ways of obtaining private sector finance", as well as that "the advantages of PPPs must be weighed against the contractual complexities and rigidities they entail".

In the United Kingdom, many private finance initiative programs ran dramatically over budget and have not provided value for money for the taxpayer, with some projects costing more to cancel than to complete. An in-depth study conducted by the National Audit Office of the United Kingdom concluded that the private finance initiative model had proved to be more expensive and less efficient in supporting hospitals, schools, and other public infrastructure than public financing. A treasury select committee stated that 'PFI was no more efficient than other forms of borrowing and it was "illusory" that it shielded the taxpayer from risk'.

Transfer of risk

One of the main rationales for P3s is that they provide for a transfer of risk: the Private partner assumes the risks in case of cost overruns or project failures. Methods for assessing value-for-money rely heavily on risk transfers to show the superiority of P3s. However, P3s do not inherently reduce risk, they simply reassign who is responsible, and the Private sector assumes that risk at a cost for the taxpayer. If the value of the risk transfer is appraised too high, then the government is overpaying for P3 projects.

Incidentally, a 2018 UK Parliament report underlines that some private investors have made large returns from PPP deals, suggesting that departments are overpaying for transferring the risks of projects to the private sector, one of the Treasury's stated benefits of PPP.

Supporters of P3s claim that risk is successfully transferred from public to private sectors as a result of P3, and that the private sector is better at risk management. As an example of successful risk transfer, they cite the case of the National Physical Laboratory. This deal ultimately caused the collapse of the building contractor Laser (a joint venture between Serco and John Laing) when the cost of the complex scientific laboratory, which was ultimately built, was very much larger than estimated.

On the other hand, Allyson Pollock argues that in many PFI projects risks are not in fact transferred to the private sector and, based on the research findings of Pollock and others, George Monbiot argues that the calculation of risk in PFI projects is highly subjective, and is skewed to favor the private sector:

Following an incident in the Royal Infirmary of Edinburgh where surgeons were forced to continue a heart operation in the dark following a power cut caused by PFI operating company Consort, Dave Watson from Unison criticized the way the PFI contract operates:

Furthermore, assessments ignore the practices of risk transfers to contractors under traditional procurement methods. As for the idea that the private sector is inherently better at managing risk, there has been no comprehensive study comparing risk management by the public sector and by P3s. Auditor Generals of Quebec, Ontario and New Brunswick have publicly questioned P3 rationales based on a transfer of risk, the latter stating he was "unable to develop any substantive evidence supporting risk transfer decisions". Furthermore, many PPP concessions proved to be unstable and required to be renegotiated to favor the contractor.

Accountability and transparency 

One of the main criticisms of public-private partnerships is the lack of accountability and transparency associated with these projects. Part of the reason why evidence of PPP performance is often unavailable is that most financial details of P3s are under the veil of commercial confidentiality provisions, and unavailable to researchers and the public. Around the world, opponents of P3s have launched judicial procedures to access greater P3 project documentation than the limited "bottom line" sheets available on the project's websites. When they are successful, the documents they receive are often heavily redacted.

A 2007 survey of U.S. city managers revealed that communities often fail to sufficiently monitor PPPs: "For instance, in 2002, only 47.3% of managers involved with private firms as delivery partners reported that they evaluate that service delivery. By 2007, that was down to 45.4%. Performance monitoring is a general concern from these surveys and in the scholarly criticisms of these arrangements."

Sectors

Water services

After a wave of privatization of many water services in the 1990s, mostly in developing countries, experiences show that global water corporations have not brought the promised improvements in public water utilities. Instead of lower prices, large volumes of investment, and improvements in the connection of the poor to water and sanitation, water tariffs have increased out of reach of poor households. Water multinationals are withdrawing from developing countries, and the World Bank is reluctant to provide support.

The privatization of the water services of the city of Paris proved to be unwanted, and at the end of 2009 the city did not renew its contract with two of the French water corporations, Suez and Veolia. After a year of being controlled by the public, it is projected that the water tariff will be cut by between 5% and 10%.

In the 2010s, as wastewater treatment plants across North America came of age and needed to be replaced, multiple cities decided to fund the renewal of their water infrastructure through a public-private partnership. Among those cities were Brandenburg, Kentucky, which was the "first local government in Kentucky to execute a public-private partnership under legislation passed in 2016", and Regina, Saskatchewan, which held a referendum on the plant's funding model. The P3 option won out."

Transportation

Another major sector for P3s is transportation. The P3 Transportation sector can be broadly split into five sectors: airports, ports, roads, railways and urban passenger transport (which includes bus, light rail and heavy rail systems).

Many P3s in the United States have been toll road concessions. Transportation projects have accounted for 1/5 of all P3 projects in Canada. Major transportation P3 projects have included the Confederation Bridge linking Prince Edward Island and New Brunswick, the Pocahontas Parkway in Virginia, and the London Underground PPP.

Health services

For more than two decades, public-private partnerships have been used to finance health infrastructure. In Canada, they comprise 1/3 of all P3 projects nationwide. Governments have looked to the PPP model in an attempt to solve larger problems in health care delivery. However, some health-care-related PPPs have been shown to cost significantly more money to develop and maintain than those developed through traditional public procurement.

A health services PPP can be described as a long-term contract (typically 15–30 years) between a public-sector authority and one or more private-sector companies operating as a legal entity. In theory, the agreements entails that the government provides purchasing power and outlines goals for an optimal health system. It then contracts a private enterprise to design, build, maintain, and/or manage the delivery of agreed-upon services over the term of the contract. Finally, the private sector receives payment for its services and assumes additional risk while benefitting from returns on its investments during the operational phase.

A criticism of P3s for Hospitals in Canada is that they result in an "internal bifurcation of authority". This occurs when the facility is operated and maintained by the private sector while the care services are delivered by the public sector. In those cases, the nursing staff cannot request their colleagues from the maintenance staff to clean something (urine, blood, etc.) or to hang workplace safety signs, even if they are standing next to each other, without the approval of the private managers.

In the UK, P3s were used to build hospitals for the National Health Service. In 2017 there were 127 PFI schemes in the English NHS. The contracts vary greatly in size. Most include the cost of running services such as facilities management, hospital portering and patient food, and these amount to around 40% of the cost. Total repayments will cost around £2.1 billion in 2017 and will reach a peak in 2029.  This is around 2% of the NHS budget.

Forestry sector
PPP options in the forest sector can include joint forest management projects between government agencies, various investors and NGOs. USAID promotes the use of P3s to assist the exploitation of certified timber and non-timber products in Third World countries by foreign companies. They claim forestry PPPs are an agent of nature conservation and the sustainable harvesting of commercialized forest products, notwithstanding the fact that it was competition from foreign companies that forced local producers to engage in unsustainable harvesting practices in the first place. Many forestry sector partnerships with NGOs are nothing more than greenwashing operations.

Institutional support 
Aside from the support of national governments and financial firms, PPPs are promoted by the following institutions:

PPP units

Public-private partnership units are organizations responsible for promoting, facilitating, and assessing P3s in their territory. They can be government agencies, or semi-independent organizations created with full or part government support. Governments tend to create these units as a response to criticisms of the implementation of P3 projects in their country prior to the creation of the P3 unit. In 2009, 50% of OECD countries had created a centralized PPP unit, and many more of these institutions exist in other countries.

Accounting firms 
The "big four" accounting firms of PricewaterhouseCoopers, Deloitte, Ernst & Young, and KPMG have been involved in the public-private partnership model from its inception. Advisors from these companies have been tapped to develop PPP policies and procedures in multiple countries. These companies then went on to evaluate those procedures, appraise individual projects, and act as a consultants for private and public partners in PPP contract negotiations. Accounting firms sometimes even have an equity stake in projects that they appraise the value for money. Due to these conflict of interests, multiple authors have argues that the “big four”’s public project appraisals are biased towards the PPP funding option against the traditional procurement model.

International institutions 

The World Bank works to promote Public-private partnerships in countries where it operates. The United Nations' Sustainable Development Goal 17 target 17.17 is formulated as: "Encourage effective partnerships: Encourage and promote effective public, public-private and civil society partnerships, building on the experience and resourcing strategies of partnerships." The success of this target is measured by the amount in United States dollars committed to public-private partnerships for infrastructure worldwide.

United States foreign policy 
The American government seeks to promote public-private partnerships around the globe to meet its various foreign policy goals. USAID promoted PPPs with Global Development Alliances and through the Development Credit Authority, which was merged into the Overseas Private Investment Corporation in 2019. The State department also promotes PPPs through its Office of Global Partnerships.

Delivery models 

There are many types and delivery models of PPPs, the following is a non-exhaustive list of some of the designs:

Operation and maintenance contract (O & M)
A private economic agent, under a government contract, operates a publicly-owned asset for a specific period of time. Formal, ownership of the asset remains with the public entity. In terms of private-sector risk and involvement, this model is on the lower end of the spectrum for both involvement and risk.

Build–finance (BF)
The private actor builds the asset and finances the cost during the construction period, afterwards the responsibility is handed over to the public entity. In terms of private-sector risk and involvement, this model is again on the lower end of the spectrum for both measures.

Build–operate–transfer (BOT)
Build–operate–transfer represents a complete integration of the project delivery: the same contract governs the design, construction, operations, maintenance, and financing of the project.  After some concessionary period, the facility is transferred back to the owner.

Build–own–operate–transfer (BOOT)
A BOOT structure differs from BOT in that the private entity owns the works. During the concession period, the private company owns and operates the facility with the prime goal to recover the costs of investment and maintenance while trying to achieve a higher margin on the project. BOOT has been used in projects like highways, roads mass transit, railway transport and power generation.

Build–own–operate (BOO)
In a BOO project ownership of the project remains usually with the project company, such as a mobile phone network. Therefore, the private company gets the benefits of any residual value of the project. This framework is used when the physical life of the project coincides with the concession period. A BOO scheme involves large amounts of finance and long payback period. Some examples of BOO projects come from the water treatment plants.

Build–lease–transfer (BLT)
Under BLT, a private entity builds a complete project and leases it to the government. In this way the control over the project is transferred from the project owner to a lessee. In other words, the ownership remains by the shareholders but operation purposes are leased. After the expiry of the leasing the ownership of the asset and the operational responsibility is transferred to the government at a previously agreed price.

Design–build–finance–maintain (DBFM)
"The private sector designs, builds and finances an asset and provides hard facility management or maintenance services under a long-term agreement." The owner (usually the public sector) operates the facility. This model is in the middle of the spectrum for private sector risk and involvement.

Design–build–finance–maintain–operate (DBFMO)
Design–build–finance–operate is a project delivery method very similar to BOOT except that there is no actual ownership transfer. Moreover, the contractor assumes the risk of financing until the end of the contract period. The owner then assumes the responsibility for maintenance and operation. This model is extensively used in specific infrastructure projects such as toll roads. The private construction company is responsible for the design and construction of a piece of infrastructure for the government, which is the true owner. Moreover, the private entity has the responsibility to raise finance during the construction and the exploitation period. Usually, the public sector begins payments to the private sector for use of the asset post-construction. This is the most commonly used model in the EU according to the European Court of Auditors.

Design–build–operate–transfer (DBOT)
This funding option is common when the client has no knowledge of what the project entails. Hence they contracts the project to a company to design, build, operate, and then transfer it. Examples of such projects are refinery constructions.

Design–construct–manage–finance (DCMF)
A private entity is entrusted to design, construct, manage, and finance a facility, based on the specifications of the government. Project cash flows result from the government's payment for the rent of the facility. Some examples of the DCMF model are prisons or public hospitals.

Concession
A concession is a grant of rights, land or property by a government, local authority, corporation, individual or other legal entity. Public services such as water supply may be operated as a concession. In the case of a public service concession, a private company enters into an agreement with the government to have the exclusive right to operate, maintain and carry out investment in a public utility (such as a water privatization) for a given number of years.

Other types 
While long-term infrastructure projects compose the bulk of P3s worldwide, other types of Public–private partnerships exist to suit different purposes and actors.

Asset monetization 
A form of P3 that became prevalent in American cities during the 21st century are asset monetization arrangements. They concerns a city's revenue-generating assets (parking lots, garage and meters, public lights, toll roads, etc.) and transforms them into financial assets that the city can lease to a private corporation in exchange for covering operation and maintenance. These deals are usually done during periods of financial distress for the city, and the immediate revenues municipalities receive is used to pay down the debt or to fill budget holes. The 2014 Detroit bankruptcy deal included many asset monetization arrangements.

Global public–private partnership

Global public–private partnership (GPPP) is a governance mechanism to foster public-private partnership (PPP) cooperation between an international intergovernmental organisation like the United Nations and private companies. Existing GPPPs strive, among other things, to increase affordable access to non-generic essential drugs and vaccines in developing countries, and to promote handwashing with soap to reduce diarrhoea.

Market-led proposal 

Market-led proposals (MLP) are P3s proposed by the private sector. MLP policies encourage private sector firms to make unsolicited P3 infrastructure project proposals to the government, instead of putting the onus on the state to propose each projects. During the 2010s, MLP policies were implemented in most Australian states and territories. Amy Sarcevic from Informa Australia notes that "to date, market-led proposals have had a relatively high failure rate".

Public–private–community partnerships
Public–private partnerships with non-profits and private partners, sometimes called Public–private–community partnerships (PPCPs), are a modified version of the PPP model designed for the needs of Third world countries. They were notably proposed by the Asian Development Bank as early as 1991 as an "institutional reform ... to facilitate the participation of individuals, CBOs [community based organizations], other NGOs and the private sector" so that they become "actively involved in planning and management".

Social impact bond 
Social impact bonds (also called pay for success bonds) are "a public-private partnership which funds effective social services through a performance-based contract", according to Social Finance's definition. They operate over a fixed period of time, but they do not offer a fixed rate of return. Generally, repayment to investors is contingent upon a specified social outcome being achieved. A similar system, development impact bonds, is being implemented in developing countries.

See also
Privatization
Industry funding of academic research
Government procurement
Government procurement in the United States
Top 100 Contractors of the U.S. federal government
Sustainable procurement
Build–operate–transfer
Economic conversion

References

Further reading

 Abou-bakr, A (2013), Managing Disasters Through Public–Private Partnerships, Georgetown University Press.
 Burnett, M. "PPP – A decision maker's guide", European Institute of Public Administration, 2007
 Chinchilla, C. "El nuevo contrato de colaboración entre el setor público y el sector privado", Revista Española de Derecho Administrativo nº 132 (2006)
 Delmon, Jeff "Private Sector Investment in Infrastructure: Project finance, PPP projects and risk," Kluwer, 2009.
 Delmon, Jeff "Public Private Partnership Programs: Creating a framework for private sector investment in infrastructure, Kluwer, 2014.
 
 
 
 Monera Frédéric, Les financements innovants de services et de projets publics, Revue de la Recherche Juridique – Droit prospectif, PUAM, 2005–1, p. 337 & s.
 Moszoro M., Gasiorowski P. (2008), 'Optimal Capital Structure of Public–Private Partnerships', IMF Working Paper 1/2008. 
 Colman, J. (2002), 'Mumbo jumbo...and other pitfalls:Evaluating PFI/PPP projects', National Audit Office PFI / PPP Conference "Bringing about beneficial change, London, May.
 Economic Planning Advisory Commission (EPAC) (1995), 'Final Report of the Private Infrastructure Task Force', Australian Government Publishing Service, Canberra.
 Economic Planning Advisory Commission (EPAC) (1995), 'Interim Report of the Private Infrastructure Task Force', Australian Government Publishing Service, Canberra.
 Harris, A. C. (1996), 'Financing infrastructure: private profits from public losses', Audit Office of NSW, Public Accounts Committee, Parliament of NSW, Conference, Public/Private infrastructure financing: Still feasible?, Sydney, September.
 Hart, Oliver (2003). "Incomplete contracts and public ownership: Remarks, and an application to public‐private partnerships". Economic Journal 113: C69-C76.
 
 House of Representatives Standing Committee on Communications Transport and Microeconomic Reform,   (1997), 'Planning not Patching: An Inquiry Into Federal Road Funding', The Parliament of the Commonwealth of Australia, Australian Government Publishing Service, Canberra.
 Industry Commission (1996), 'Competitive Tendering and Contracting by Public Sector Agencies', Australian Government Publishing Service, Canberra.
 
 Loxley, J. (2010). Public service, private profits: the political economy of public/private partnerships in Canada. Fernwood Publishing. 224 p.
 Minnow, Martha and Jody Freeman (2009), Government By Contract: Outsourcing and American Democracy, Harvard U.P.
 MSI Integrity. (2020). "Not Fit-for-Purpose The Grand Experiment of Multi-Stakeholder Initiatives in Corporate Accountability, Human Rights and Global Governance." San Francisco: Institute for Multi-Stakeholder Initiative Integrity
 
 Möric, K. (2009), 'Les partenariats public-privé – le choix du partenaire privé au regard du droit communautaire, Editions Larcier, 264 p.
 
 Quiggin, J. (1996), 'Private sector involvement in infrastructure projects', Australian Economic Review, 1st quarter, 51–64.
 
 Spackman, M. (2002), 'Public–private partnerships: lessons from the British approach', Economic Systems, 26(3), 283–301.
 Strauch, L. (2009), 'Public Private Partnership in European Road Infrastructure: PPP as Investment Asset Following the M6 Road Project in Hungary', VDM.
 Talibdjanov, N. and Koshnazarov, S. UNDP & Chamber of Commerce and Industry of Uzbekistan, Public-Private Partnership in Uzbekistan: Problems, Opportunities and Ways of Introduction (2008–2009)
 Venkat Raman, A. and J. W. Bjorkman (2009), 'Public-Private Partnerships in Health Care in India: Lessons for Developing Countries'. London. Routledge.
 Whiteside, H. (2015). Purchase for profit: public-private partnerships and Canada's public health-care system. University of Toronto Press.

 
Government finances
Public economics
Government procurement
Privatization